Paul Madonna (born 1972) is an American artist.

Biography 
Paul Madonna grew up in Pittsburgh, Pennsylvania. While still in high school he began attending art classes at Carnegie-Mellon University, where he went on to complete a B.F.A. in 1994. During his senior year of college, Madonna became the first art intern ever taken in by Mad magazine. Upon graduation, he moved to San Francisco and began making minicomics, which he left in public places for free. In 2003, Madonna created "All Over Coffee", which was picked up by the San Francisco Chronicle in 2004. The series ran for twelve years, for a total of 726 strips, with the final strip running on December 27, 2015.  Madonna has served as "cartoonist-in-residence" artist in residence at San Francisco's Cartoon Art Museum, and was the recipient of the Northern California Book Award's Recognition Award for Best Book of the Year, 2011, for his second book, Everything is its own reward. His work is exhibited internationally in galleries and museums, and his books continue to sell around the world.

Art career 
Madonna is an artist and writer with a background in painting. He is best known for his series "All Over Coffee," which he called a 'strip,' a comic strip without the comic, which feature detailed ink-on-paper drawings of urban cityscapes paired with flash fiction stories. Madonna began all his drawings for the series on site, and straight to ink. He began with rendering his home town of San Francisco but has gone on to draw many U.S. cities including New York and Los Angeles, as well as international locations such as Paris, Rome, Amsterdam, Buenos Aires, Shanghai, Beijing, and Tokyo.   "All Over Coffee" ran four days a week for a year and a half in the Daily and Sunday Datebook section of the San Francisco Chronicle, then six months at three days a week, finally settling into weekly publication for another ten years. In that time, City Lights Books published two collections, All Over Coffee (2007), and Everything is its own reward (2011). In 2015 Madonna ended the series with a story known as The Eviction Series, which is an absurdist short story about the tech boom in the San Francisco Bay Area. Shortly after, City Lights contracted The Eviction Series for a book, On to the Next Dream, which was released in 2017.

In 2016 Madonna released his first illustrated novel, Close Enough for the Angels, as a limited edition book at the Dryansky Gallery in San Francisco. The book features fictional artist Emit Hopper, 'a one-hit wonder, twice' who, after twenty years, is having a comeback. It is Madonna's first foray into long form narrative. A commercial edition is slated for fall of 2017.

Madonna is also a prolific gallery artist, showing his original work internationally. His work has been shown in the Oakland Museum and the Contemporary Jewish Museum in San Francisco.

Madonna also produces the comic strip "Small Potatoes".  In contrast to his detailed pen and ink drawings of All Over Coffee, the series uses deliberately rudimentary characters, drawn in a quick, loose hand.

Works 
Follow Yourself: An Affirmation of the Creative Life (City Lights, 2018) 
On to the Next Dream (City Lights, 2017) 
Everything is its own reward by Paul Madonna (City Lights, 2011) 
All Over Coffee by Paul Madonna (City Lights, 2007) 
Album 01" (2009, Electric Works / Paul Madonna Studio)A Writer's San Francisco: A Guided Journey for the Creative Soul'' by Eric Maisel, illustrated by Paul Madonna (New World Library, 2006)

References

External links 

San Francisco Chronicle profile
SFist Interview with Paul Madonna
 Study of poetics and spirituality in the work of Paul Madonna 

American artists
Living people
1972 births
Carnegie Mellon University alumni